La Hiniesta, 7 km from the capital, Zamora, of (Reino de León) currently belongs to the province of the same name in the Comunidad Autónoma de Castilla-León in Spain. Uts population was 364 inhabitants (Census 2004 by INE). Its major attraction is the Iglesia de Santa María, a church that King Sancho IV of Leon ordered built in the honor of the Virgin, who appeared to him in una cacería entre unas hiniestas o retamas, from whence it gets its more frequently-used name, Virgen de la Hiniesta. Among its more famous products are the sheep milk cheese, of exquisite purity, of both natural and artisanal manufacture.

References

Municipalities of the Province of Zamora
Castilian culture